Chile competed at the 2014 Summer Youth Olympics, in Nanjing, China from 16 August to 28 August 2014.

Medalists
Medals awarded to participants of mixed-NOC (Combined) teams are represented in italics. These medals are not counted towards the individual NOC medal tally.

Athletics

Chile qualified two athletes.

Qualification Legend: Q=Final A (medal); qB=Final B (non-medal); qC=Final C (non-medal); qD=Final D (non-medal); qE=Final E (non-medal)

Boys
Track & road events

Field Events

Equestrian

Chile qualified a rider.

Modern Pentathlon

Chile qualified one athlete based on its performance at the PANAM YOG Qualifiers.

Rowing

Chile qualified two boats based on its performance at the Latin American Qualification Regatta.

Qualification Legend: FA=Final A (medal); FB=Final B (non-medal); FC=Final C (non-medal); FD=Final D (non-medal); SA/B=Semifinals A/B; SC/D=Semifinals C/D; R=Repechage

Sailing

Chile qualified one boat based on its performance at the Byte CII Central & South American Continental Qualifier. Later they were given a reallocation spot based on being a top ranked nation not yet qualified.

Swimming

Chile qualified one swimmer.

Boys

Taekwondo

Chile qualified one athlete based on its performance at the Taekwondo Qualification Tournament.

Boys

Triathlon

Chile qualified two athletes based on its performance at the 2014 American Youth Olympic Games Qualifier.

Individual

Relay

Weightlifting

Chile was given a reallocation spot for being a top ranked nation not yet qualified.

Girls

References

2014 in Chilean sport
Nations at the 2014 Summer Youth Olympics
Chile at the Youth Olympics